Skalzang Dorje (born 23 October 1970) is a former internationally competing Indian archer. He competed in the men's individual and team events at the 1996 Summer Olympics. In the men's event, he achieved the 47th place, after losing to Italy's Matteo Bisiani. In the team event, alongside India's Changte Lalremsanga and Limba Ram, he achieved the 14th place.

Overall, Dorje won 12 international medals and 32 national medals in his archery career. At the 1994 National Games in Maharashtra, Dorje won two silver medals, in the 70m and 90m categories.

Dorje hails from the Spiti valley (Himachal Pradesh, India), and lives in Kaza, Spiti valley. He serves as the person in-charge of the Youth Services and Sports Department, Spiti division, Lahaul-and-Spiti district. Alongside, with Karanbir Singh Bedi, Dorje runs Kaza's Deyzor Hotel.

References

1970 births
Living people
Indian male archers
Olympic archers of India
Archers at the 1996 Summer Olympics
Place of birth missing (living people)
People from Lahaul and Spiti district